David Arthur Saunders Davies (9 June 1792 – 22 May 1857) was a British Conservative politician, and barrister.

Saunders Davies was the son of David Davies, a physician, who married Susanna, daughter and heiress of Erasmus Saunders of Pentre. He was educated at Harrow and Oxford.  He married Elizabeth Maria, daughter of Colonel Owen Philipps, in 1829. He was admitted to Christ Church, Oxford in 1810, aged 18, and graduated with a Bachelor of Arts in 1814 and a Master of Arts in 1817,  before being admitted into Lincoln's Inn in 1818.

Davies was elected MP for Carmarthenshire at a by-election in 1842—caused by the death of John Jones of Ystrad—and held the seat until his death in 1857.

Also a chairman of the Cardiganshire quarter sessionsand a Justice of the Peace, Davies died at the United University gentlemen's club in London.

References

External links
 

Conservative Party (UK) MPs for Welsh constituencies
People educated at Harrow School
Alumni of Christ Church, Oxford
UK MPs 1841–1847
UK MPs 1847–1852
UK MPs 1852–1857
UK MPs 1857–1859
1792 births
1857 deaths